Park Ji-suk (born 4 December 1972) is a South Korean gymnast. She competed in six events at the 1988 Summer Olympics.

References

External links
 

1972 births
Living people
South Korean female artistic gymnasts
Olympic gymnasts of South Korea
Gymnasts at the 1988 Summer Olympics
Place of birth missing (living people)
Asian Games medalists in gymnastics
Gymnasts at the 1990 Asian Games
Asian Games bronze medalists for South Korea
Medalists at the 1990 Asian Games
20th-century South Korean women